is a stable of sumo wrestlers, part of the Dewanoumi group of stables. It is situated in Tokyo's Ōta ward. It was established in August 2006 by former komusubi Hamanoshima, who branched off from Mihogaseki stable and took several of its leading wrestlers with him. For its first few years, Onoe stable was located in what was essentially a "converted garage," where numerous miscellaneous items were only about a meter away from the edge of the practice ring's straw bales.

In November 2007, it had eight wrestlers, half of whom were ranked as sekitori (in the top two divisions). In 2011, three of its wrestlers, former maegashira ranked Sakaizawa, and Yamamotoyama and the former jūryō Shirononami, were forced to retire after being found guilty by the Japan Sumo Association of match-fixing. The retirements of Satoyama in November 2018 and Tenkaihō in March 2019 left the stable with no wrestlers in the top two divisions until   reached jūryō in July 2019, but he suddenly left sumo in September 2021 due to an ankle injury. As of January 2023, Onoe stable has 12 wrestlers. It has posted regular updates from its Facebook page since training at the stable was curtailed due to the COVID-19 pandemic.

Owner
2006–present: 17th Onoe (shunin, former komusubi Hamanoshima)

Notable active wrestlers
None

Coaches
Sanoyama Kōsaku (toshiyori, former maegashira Satoyama)
Hidenoyama Takayuki (toshiyori, former maegashira Tenkaihō)

Notable former members
Baruto (former ōzeki)
Sakaizawa (former maegashira)
Satoyama (former maegashira)
Tenkaihō (former maegashira)
Yamamotoyama (former maegashira)

Hairdresser
Tokohama (5th class tokoyama)

Location
Tokyo, Ōta ward, Ikegami 8-8-8

See also
List of sumo stables
List of active sumo wrestlers
List of past sumo wrestlers
Glossary of sumo terms

References

External links
Official site 
Japan Sumo Association profile
Article on Onoe stable

Active sumo stables